Kurisinkal Sebastian Manoj (born 19 April 1965) is an 
Indian politician and physician. He hails from Kerala and was a Member of Parliament for the 14th Lok Sabha, representing Alappuzha Lok Sabha constituency as a Communist Party of India (Marxist) (CPI(M)) candidate. He won against Indian National Congress leader V. M. Sudheeran in the 2004 Indian general election in Kerala. He contested the 2009 Lok Sabha elections again from the same constituency, losing to Indian National Congress (INC) candidate K. C. Venugopal.

He resigned from CPI(M) on 9 January 2010, citing that the line of the party clashed with his religious beliefs. A rectification document produced by the party in 2009 had barred any member from practising one’s religion and affirming one’s belief in God. The document, a code of conduct for members that was approved by the central committee last year, says members and elected representatives “shall neither organise religious functions nor observe religious rituals”.

He joined Indian National Congress on 13 September 2010. He has been nominated as the United Democratic Front (Kerala) candidate for Alappuzha (State Assembly constituency) in the 2021 Kerala Legislative Assembly election.
 
Some of the most important bills presented by Manoj in the 14th Lok Sabha include "The Fishermen (Welfare) Bill 2005", "The Petrol Pump Workers (Welfare) Bill 2005" and "The Coir Factory Workers (Welfare) Bill 2006".

Educational qualifications
 M.B.B.S., M.D., D.A.(Diploma in Anaesthesiology)
 Educated at T. D. Medical College, Alappuzha and Govt. Medical College, Thiruvananthapuram

Other positions held
 Member, Committee on Defence
 Member, Consultative Committee, Ministry of Agriculture
 Member, Standing Committee on Defence
 Assistant Insurance Medical Officer, 1993–98
 Lecturer in Anaesthesiology, 1998–2004
 Consultant in Anaesthesiology, 2005–present
 Life Member, (i) Indian Medical Association; (ii) Indian Society of Pain and Palliative Care; (iii) Indian Society of Anaesthesiologists;
 Former State Secretary, Kerala Govt. Medical College Teachers Association
 Member, National Service Scheme
 Former President, Kerala Catholic Youth Movement (KCYM)
 Member, Academic Council, University of Kerala
 Former President Kerala Latin Catholic Association, (KLCA) Alappuzha Diocese 
 Former General Secretary, Kerala Latin Catholic Association, Alappuzha Diocese

References

Politicians from Alappuzha
1965 births
India MPs 2004–2009
Living people
Indian Roman Catholics
Malayali politicians
Lok Sabha members from Kerala
Communist Party of India (Marxist) politicians from Kerala
Indian National Congress politicians from Kerala